Louisiana Highway 387 (LA 387) was a state highway that served Plaquemines Parish.  It spanned  in a south to north direction along the west bank of the Mississippi River in Belle Chasse.

Route description
From the south, LA 387 began at an intersection with LA 23 in Belle Chasse.  It proceeded north along the west bank of the Mississippi River and turned northeast just before its end at the former U.S. Naval Ammunition Depot.

LA 387 was an undivided, two-lane highway for its entire length.

History
LA 387 was originally designated as part of State Route 996 prior to the 1955 Louisiana Highway renumbering.  At one time, State Route 996 followed the river road from Belle Chasse to Algiers in New Orleans.

Major intersections

References

External links

La DOTD State, District, and Parish Maps
District 02
Plaquemines Parish (Northwest Section)

0387
Transportation in Plaquemines Parish, Louisiana